Wied-Neuwied was a German statelet in northeastern Rhineland-Palatinate, Germany, located northeast of the Rhine River flanking the northern side of the city of Neuwied. Wied-Neuwied emerged from the partitioning of Wied. Its status was elevated from county to principality in 1784. It was mediatised to Nassau and Prussia in 1806.

The House of Wied-Neuwied briefly ruled the Principality of Albania in 1914 through William of Albania, the younger son of Prince William. Among other notable members of the family were Prince Alexander Philip Maximilian, the second son of Prince John Frederick Alexander and a famous explorer, ethnologist and naturalist, and Princess Elisabeth, a daughter of Prince Hermann, who married King Carol I of Romania.

Counts of Wied-Neuwied (1698–1784)
Frederick William, 1698–1737
John Frederick Alexander, 1737–1784

Princes of Wied-Neuwied (1784–1806)
John Frederick Alexander, 1784–1791
Frederick Charles, 1791–1802
John Augustus, 1802–1806

Heads of the House of Wied-Neuwied (1806–present)

  John Augustus, 3rd Prince 1806-1836 (1779–1836) 
  Hermann, 4th Prince 1836-1864 (1814–1864)
  William, 5th Prince 1864-1907 (1845–1907)
 William Frederick, 6th Prince 1907-1945 (1872–1945)
 Hereditary Prince Hermann (1899-1941)
 Friedrich William, 7th Prince 1945-2000 (1931-2000)
 Prince Alexander (b.1960) - renounced rights
 Carl, 8th Prince 2000-2015 (1961–2015)
 Maximilian, 9th Prince 2015–present (b.1999)
  Prince Friedrich (b.2001)
  Prince Wolff-Heinrich (b.1979) 
  Prince Metfried (b.1935)
 Prince Christian (b.1968)
 Prince Constantin (b.2003)
 Prince Leopold (b.2006)
 Prince Alexander (b.2007)
  Prince Friedrich (b.2010)
  Prince Magnus (b.1972)
  Prince Dietrich (1901-1976)
 Prince Maximilian (1929-2008)
 Prince Ulrich (1931-2010)
  Prince Wilhelm (b.1970)
 Prince Friedrich (b.2001)
 Prince George (b.2004)
  Prince Philipp (b.2010)
  Prince Ludwig-Eugen (1938-2001)
  Prince Edzard (b.1968)
  Wilhelm, Prince of Albania 1914 (1876–1945)
  Carol Victor, Hereditary Prince of Albania (1917–1977)

References

1806 disestablishments
States and territories established in 1698
 
1698 establishments in the Holy Roman Empire